The European Short Course Swimming Championships (variously referred to informally as the "Short Course Europeans" or "European 25m Championships") are a swimming meet, organized by LEN. The meet features swimmers from Europe, competing in events in a short course (25-meter) pool. The meet has traditionally been held in the beginning of December. Annual until 2013, the event now occurs in odd years.

History
The Championships were first held in 1996, and were preceded by the "European Sprint Swimming Championships" which were held from 1991–1994. The Sprint meet featured 14 events: the 50s of the strokes, the 100 Individual Medley, and 4x50 relays (free and medley). 

In 1996, the meet expanded to 38 events, adding the 100s and 200s of stroke, the 400 and 800/1500 frees, and the 200 and 400 IMs; and the name was changed to "Short Course". LEN also started numbering the championships again, such that 2011's meet was the 15th edition. In 2012, the meet expanded to 40 events: 19 for men, 19 for women, and two mixed. Of each 19, 17 are individual and 2 are relays.

Editions

Medals (1991–2021)

Note 1:  medals Consist of  medals also.

Note 2:  is a former country.

See also
 List of European Championships records in swimming
 List of European Short Course Swimming Championships medalists (men)
 List of European Short Course Swimming Championships medalists (women)

References

 
International swimming competitions
Recurring sporting events established in 1996
Swimming competitions in Europe
LEN European Aquatics Championships
LEN competitions
1996 establishments in Europe